Darik is a village in the Amasia Municipality of the Shirak Province of Armenia.

Demographics

References

External links 

Populated places in Shirak Province